The Goldman and Son Store is a historic commercial building at 101 Main Street in Clarendon, Arkansas.  Built in 1893, this single-story brick building with pressed-metal facade is the oldest commercial building in the city, and the only 19th-century commercial building in active use.  It was first used by a dry goods and cotton merchant, and in 1930 converted for use by a fish dealer.

The building was listed on the National Register of Historic Places in 1984.

See also
National Register of Historic Places listings in Monroe County, Arkansas

References

Commercial buildings on the National Register of Historic Places in Arkansas
Commercial buildings completed in 1893
Buildings and structures in Monroe County, Arkansas
National Register of Historic Places in Monroe County, Arkansas